Dwarkanath Madhav Pitale (Devanagari: द्वारकानाथ माधव पितळे) (1882–1928)  was a Marathi writer from Bombay Presidency, British India.

He wrote under the pen name Nath Madhav (नाथमाधव) historical and social novels, the latter dealing with encouragement of women’s education and remarriages of widows, condemnation of the abhorrent practice of arranged marriages of children with adults, and similar social issues of his times. He lived in Pune.

Some of his novels, including the following:
 Sawlya Tandel (सावळ्या तांडेल)
 "Veerdhaval" (वीरधवल)
 Rayaclub or Soneri Toli (रायाक्लब उर्फ़ सोनेरी टोळी)
 Wihangwrund (विहंगवृंद)
 Doctor (डॉक्टर)
 Swarajyacha Shreeganesha (स्वराज्याचा श्रीगणेशा)
 Deshmukhwadi (देशमुखवाडी)

Notes

Marathi-language writers
Writers in British India
1880s births
1928 deaths